InterContinental Bali Resort is a five-star hotel and resort in Jimbaran in southern Bali, Indonesia. It is operated by the InterContinental Hotels Group. The hotel overlooks Jimbaran Bay. The hotel has 418 rooms and fuses elements of traditional Balinese architecture with modern western architecture. 

The Jimbaran Gardens serves seafood, Indonesian & international cuisine, as well as casual dining at the poolside. The KO Japanese Restaurant specialises in Japanese cuisine. The hotel also has the Saraswati Lobby Lounge, Sunset Beach Bar, Club Lounge and Bella Cucina Italian Restaurant. The hotel also operates the Planet Trekkers Children's Resort,  mini resort for children.

References

External links
Official site

Resorts in Indonesia
Hotels in Bali
InterContinental hotels
Hotel buildings completed in 1993